was a Japanese male tennis player who represented Japan in the Olympic Games. He competed in the singles event at the 1924 Summer Olympics, losing in the first round to Jean Borotra. With compatriot Masanosuke Fukuda he competed in the men's doubles event and reached the second round.

References

External links
 

Japanese male tennis players
Olympic tennis players of Japan
Tennis players at the 1924 Summer Olympics
Year of birth missing
Year of death missing
20th-century Japanese people